Xenia is a village in Clay County, Illinois, United States. The population was 380 at the 2020 census.

Geography
Xenia is located in southwestern Clay County at  (38.6373694, -88.6374130). U.S. Route 50 passes to the north of the village, leading east  to Flora and west  to Salem.

History
The hunting camps of Kiffcart and Retherford were located in the southwest corner of Section 4. The buffalo trail was very wide in this area; therefore, Lewis located in the northwest quarter of Section 3. Lewis remained there until 1830 when he sold his property to Dr. Davenport. A post office was established at the Davenport home with the help of John Pierce and John Gowdy, establishing the town of Xenia. The building of the railroad in 1854 expanded the town, and by 1870 the population had increased to 1,000. A sesquicentennial celebration was held in 1984.

Demographics

As of the 2020 census there were 380 people, 156 households, and 85 families residing in the village. The racial makeup of the village was 91.58% White, 0.53% Native American, 0.53% Asian, 0.26% from other races, and 7.11% from two or more races. Hispanic or Latino of any race were 3.68% of the population.

There were 156 households, out of which 55.13% had children under the age of 18 living with them, 42.95% were married couples living together, 5.77% had a female householder with no husband present, and 45.51% were non-families. 41.03% of all households were made up of individuals, and 16.67% had someone living alone who was 65 years of age or older. The average household size was 3.32 and the average family size was 2.34.

The village's age distribution consisted of 29.6% under the age of 18, 8.5% from 18 to 24, 21.4% from 25 to 44, 21.1% from 45 to 64, and 19.5% who were 65 years of age or older. The median age was 35.5 years. For every 100 females, there were 108.6 males. For every 100 females age 18 and over, there were 114.2 males.

The median income for a household in the village was $44,167, and the median income for a family was $68,750. Males had a median income of $44,896 versus $22,500 for females. The per capita income for the village was $21,818. About 8.2% of families and 14.2% of the population were below the poverty line, including 13.0% of those under age 18 and 12.7% of those age 65 or over.

Notable people 

 Darren Bailey, Illinois state senator and Republican gubernatorial nominee

See also

 List of municipalities in Illinois

References

External links

 Community website

Villages in Clay County, Illinois